The Eastern Illinois Panthers men's soccer team represents Eastern Illinois University (EIU) as an Associate member of the Summit League in NCAA Division I soccer. The Panthers play their home matches at Lakeside Soccer Field located directly south of the Lantz Arena complex on the EIU campus in Charleston, Illinois.

Conference membership
Eastern Illinois is currently a full member of the Ohio Valley Conference (OVC) which does not sponsor men's soccer, so EIU is an associate member of the Summit League for men's soccer, as well as for men's and women's swimming & diving.

In 1982, EIU was one of the eight charter members of the Association of Mid-Continent Universities (AMCU) which changed its name to the Mid-Continent Conference (Mid-Con) in 1989 and became the Summit League in 2007. The Panthers played soccer in the AMCU/Mid-Con until leaving for membership in the OVC in 1996. Upon joining the OVC, EIU also became an Affiliate member of the Missouri Valley Conference (MVC) for men's soccer. The Panthers swimming & diving teams had returned to the Mid-Con in 1996; in 2011, EIU cut its membership to only two conferences as the men's soccer returned to what is now the Summit League.

Season results
References:

Retired numbers

Notes

Notable former athletes
 Mike Novotny, Goalkeeper for Chicago House AC
 Schellas Hyndman, former head coach of soccer's FC Dallas
 Matt Bobo, former North American Soccer League player
 John Baretta, former North American Soccer League goalkeeper
 George Gorleku, former Major Indoor Soccer League (1978–92) player
 LeBaron Hollimon, former National Professional Soccer League (1984–2001) player
 Damien Kelly, former National Professional Soccer League (1984–2001) player
 Mark Simpson, former goalkeeper and assistant coach for D.C. United
 Jason Thompson, former player for D.C. United
 Glen Tourville, former Major Indoor Soccer League (1978–92) player

See also
NCAA Division I Men's Soccer Tournament appearances by school
NCAA Men's Division II Soccer Tournament appearances by school

References

External links